The Montenegro women's national under-21 handball team represents Montenegro in international under-21 handball competitions.
The current head coach is Nikola Petrović.

World Championship results
2008 – 8th place
2010 – 3rd place
2016 – 17th place
2018 – 16th place
2022 – 10th place

References

External links
Official Website

Handball in Montenegro
Women's national junior handball teams
H